The Order of Saint Nicholas may refer to:

Order of Saint Nicholas (Georgia)
Order of Saint Nicholas Thaumaturgus (Wrangel), 1920
Order of Saint Nicholas the Wonderworker, 1929, Russia (Exile) 
Order of Saint Nicholas Thaumaturgus (International)
Order of Saint Nicholas (Melkite Greek Catholic Eparchy of Newton), a regional lay order founded in 1991